The orange-fronted fruit dove (Ptilinopus aurantiifrons) is a species of bird in the family Columbidae. It is found in New Guinea. Its natural habitats are subtropical or tropical moist lowland forest and subtropical or tropical mangrove forest.

References

orange-fronted fruit dove
Birds of New Guinea
orange-fronted fruit dove
orange-fronted fruit dove
Taxonomy articles created by Polbot